This page details the records, statistics and career achievements of American basketball player Kevin Durant. Durant is an American basketball small forward who plays for the Phoenix Suns of the National Basketball Association.

NBA career statistics
Statistics are correct through the end of the 2017–18 season.

Regular season

Playoffs

Career-highs

Awards and accomplishments

NBA
2× NBA champion: , 
2× NBA Finals Most Valuable Player: , 
NBA Most Valuable Player: 
NBA Rookie of the Year: 
10× All-NBA selection:
NBA All-Star Game MVP: , 2019
NBA All-Star Game Captain: 2021
2× NBA All-Star Weekend H-O-R-S-E Competition champion: , 
NBA Rookie Challenge MVP: 
NBA All-Rookie First Team: 
14× NBA Western Conference Player of the Month 
1× NBA Eastern Conference Player of the Month
26× NBA Western Conference Player of the Week
3× NBA Eastern Conference Player of the Week
5× NBA Western Conference Rookie of the Month
Best Male Athlete ESPY Award winner: 2014
Best NBA Player ESPY Award winner: 2014
Best Championship Performance ESPY Award winner: 2017

Texas
Consensus National Player of the Year: 2007
Consensus first team All-American: 2007
Adolph Rupp Trophy (first freshman to win this award): 2007
John R. Wooden Award (first freshman to win this award): 2007
National Association of Basketball Coaches Player of the Year (only freshman to ever win this award): 2007
AP Player of the Year (first freshman to win this award): 2007
Naismith Men's College Player of the Year (first freshman to win this award): 2007
USBWA National Freshman of the Year: 2007
Big 12 Player of the Year: 2007
Big 12 Freshman of the Year: 2007
All-Big 12 First Team (unanimous): 2007
Big 12 All-Defensive team: 2007
Big 12 All-Rookie team (unanimous): 2007
Big 12 Tournament Most Valuable Player Award: 2007
4× Big 12 Player of the Week
6× Big 12 Rookie of the Week

NBA achievements

Regular season

Career 
 Youngest player in NBA history to win an NBA scoring title. (21 years, 197 days)
 Youngest player in NBA history to join the 50–40–90 club.
 2nd youngest player in NBA History to record 10,000 career points. (24 years, 34 days)
 The youngest is LeBron James.
One of five players in NBA history to win the NBA scoring title in 4 or more seasons.
Includes Wilt Chamberlain, Michael Jordan, George Gervin, and Allen Iverson.
One of eight players in NBA history to win the NBA scoring title in three consecutive seasons.
Includes Michael Jordan (twice), George Mikan, Neil Johnston, Wilt Chamberlain, Bob McAdoo, George Gervin, and James Harden.

Season 
 One of three players in NBA history to score 25 points or more for 40 straight games in one season. (41 games)
 Includes Wilt Chamberlain (80 games), Michael Jordan (40 games)
 One of four players in NBA history to average 20+ points per game for an entire season as a teenager.
 Includes LeBron James, Carmelo Anthony, and Luka Doncic.
 One of four players in NBA History to record at least 400 points during the first 15 games of a season at age 21 or younger.
 Includes LeBron James (twice), Shaquille O'Neal, and Michael Jordan.
 One of eight players in NBA history to shoot 50+% on field goals, 40+% on 3-point field goals and 90+% on free throws for an entire season.(must have met NBA minimum requirements to qualify)
 Includes Larry Bird, Mark Price, Reggie Miller, Steve Nash, Dirk Nowitzki, Stephen Curry, and Malcolm Brogdon.
 One of ten players in NBA history to average 30+ points per game for an entire season having started every game.
 Includes Wilt Chamberlain, Kareem Abdul-Jabbar, Adrian Dantley, Bernard King, Dominique Wilkins, Michael Jordan, Allen Iverson, Kobe Bryant, and Dwyane Wade.
 One of fifteen players in NBA history to record 30+ points in 10+ consecutive regular season games.
 Includes Wilt Chamberlain, Oscar Robertson, Kareem Abdul-Jabbar, Nate Archibald, Jerry West, Moses Malone, World B. Free, George Gervin, Michael Jordan, Karl Malone, Kobe Bryant, Tracy McGrady, Shaquille O'Neal, LeBron James, James Harden.

Playoffs

Career 
 2nd place all-time for most consecutive playoff series averaging at least 25 points per game with 14.
 Behind Michael Jordan (37).

Game 
 Worst field goal percentage in a playoff game. (minimum of 30 attempts): 21.2%
 One of three players in NBA History to record at least 35 points, 15 rebounds, 5 assists on road in a series clincher.
 Includes Magic Johnson and Elgin Baylor.

Other Records

All-Star Game 
 Highest points per game average in NBA All-Star history. (minimum of 3 appearances): 25.6
 Most field goals attempted in an NBA All-Star Game: 27 (on February 16, 2014, in the 63rd NBA All-Star Game)
 Tied with Rick Barry and Michael Jordan.
 Most consecutive NBA All-Star games with 30+ points: 3 (2012 NBA All-Star Game – 2014 NBA All-Star Game)
 One of four players in NBA history to record a triple double in the All Star Game.
includes LeBron James, Dwyane Wade, and Michael Jordan.

Set with Russell Westbrook 
 They finished the 2015–16 regular season with combined totals of 3,907 points, 1,215 rebounds and 1,195 assists. No other pair of teammates in NBA history has combined to produce as many points, rebounds and assists in one season. 
 T-1st place all-time for most combined points in a game by teammates who were both making their NBA Finals debut.
 Durant and Westbrook scored 36 points and 27 points, respectively, in Game 1 of the 2012 NBA Finals.
 Tied with Julius Erving's 33 and Doug Collins' 30 points in Game 1 of the 1977 NBA Finals.
 2nd place all-time for most playoff games by a duo with at least 25 points each in the same game with 34.
 Behind Jerry West and Elgin Baylor.
 Only pair of teammates in NBA history to each have at least 30 points, 10 rebounds and nine assists in a game.
 Occurred in playoffs.
 Only pair of teammates in NBA history to each have at least 40 points in the same game, multiple times.
 They have achieved this four times.
 One of two pairs of teammates in NBA history to each win the scoring title in consecutive years.
 Paul Arizin and Neil Johnston were the first to achieve this in 1952 and 1953.
 One of three pairs of teammates in NBA history with a 50-point game and a 40-point game in the same game.
 Kiki Vandeweghe 51 points, Alex English 47 points; Denver Nuggets vs. Detroit Pistons, December 13, 1983 (3 OT) (highest scoring game in NBA history)
 George Gervin 50 points, Mike Mitchell 45 points; San Antonio Spurs vs. Milwaukee Bucks, March 6, 1982 (3 OT)
 One of four pairs of teammates in NBA history to have one player score at least 30 points in the same playoff game in which his teammate had at least 25 points and 15 assists, twice.
 Includes Kareem Abdul-Jabbar and Magic Johnson, Karl Malone and John Stockton, and Amar'e Stoudemire and Steve Nash.

Seattle SuperSonics/Oklahoma City Thunder records and achievements

Regular season

Career
Career records cited from Basketball Reference's Seattle SuperSonics/Oklahoma City Thunder Career Leaders page unless noted otherwise.
Points per game: 27.1
Free throws made: 3766
Free throws attempted: 4263
Games with 50+ points: 4
Games with 40+ points: 35
Games with 30+ points: 195
Consecutive games of 40+ points: 2 (2 times) (April 4–6, 2010 & January 26–28, 2011)
Tied with Dale Ellis (January 3–5, 1989)
Consecutive games of 30+ points: 12 (January 7–29, 2014)
Consecutive games of 20+ points: 63 (November 10, 2015 – April 9, 2016)

Season
Season records cited from Basketball Reference's Seattle SuperSonics/Oklahoma City Thunder Season leaders page unless noted otherwise.
Points: 2593 (2013–14)
Points per game: 32.0 (2013–14)
Free throws made: 756 (2009–10)
Free throws attempted: 840 (2009–10)
Consecutive games of 30+ points: 12 (January 7–29, 2014)
Consecutive games of 20+ points: 47

Game
Free throws made: 24 (on January 1, 2013, vs. Los Angeles Clippers)
Free throws made without a miss: 21 (on January 18, 2013, vs. Dallas Mavericks)
Turnovers: 11 (on January 22, 2014, vs San Antonio Spurs)
2nd player in franchise history to score 45+ points on better than 75.0% shooting

High school
2006 Co-MVP McDonald's All-American Game
2006 First-team Parade All-American
2005 Second-team Parade All-American

References

Career achievements of basketball players